IP Systems Ltd. is a consultancy and IT  company specialized for the liberalized European energy market. Its applications support the whole energy trading process from forecasting and nomination to allocation and accounting.

History 
IP Systems was set up in 2008. In 2011 the company started its international growth.

International participation 
 Gas Balancing-IP introduced in 2012 on the 4th Energy Trading Week was recommended for the use on regional level, furthermore in a unique way besides FGSZ Natural Gas Transmission Closed Company Limited, IP Systems was also invited by ENTSOG to the working group to help developing the European natural gas balancing model.

Awards and appreciations 
 Gas Balancing-IP won the ’ICT project of the year’ award of the IVSZ ICT Association of Hungary and National Innovation Office in 2012.

References 

Software companies of Hungary
Software companies established in 2008
Hungarian companies established in 2008